Robert Pinter (born 6 January 1968) is a Romanian butterfly and freestyle swimmer. He competed in two events at the 1992 Summer Olympics.

References

External links
 

1968 births
Living people
Romanian male butterfly swimmers
Romanian male freestyle swimmers
Olympic swimmers of Romania
Swimmers at the 1992 Summer Olympics
Sportspeople from Baia Mare